The Systellommatophora (synonym Gymnomorpha) is a clade of primitive, air-breathing  slugs, according to the taxonomy of the Gastropoda (Bouchet & Rocroi, 2005). 

They are marine and terrestrial pulmonate gastropods within the Heterobranchia. There are two superfamilies in this clade. Slugs in the superfamily Onchidioidea are primarily marine (except for five land-dwelling or freshwater species), whereas slugs in the superfamily Veronicelloidea are primarily terrestrial.

Anatomy 
No species in this clade have shells as adults. These slugs are distinguished by the location of the anus at the rear of the body.

Although neither superfamily bears shells as adults, the Onchidioidea do possess a vestigial, non-mineralized shell sac and possess a larval shell. It is not known whether or not the veronicellids bear a larval shell.

Taxonomy
According to the previous taxonomy of the Gastropoda (Ponder & Lindberg, 1997) Systellommatophora was considered to be a suborder or an order.

The following two superfamilies and families have been recognized in the taxonomy of Bouchet & Rocroi (2005):
 superfamily Onchidioidea Rafinesque, 1815
 Onchidiidae Rafinesque, 1815    
 Superfamily Veronicelloidea Gray, 1840
 Veronicellidae Gray, 1840
 Rathouisiidae Heude, 1885

References

Panpulmonata